Bala Hissar, also spelt Bala Hisar, is a historic fortress located in Peshawar, Khyber Pakhtunkhwa, Pakistan. First mentioned by 7th-century explorer Xuanzang, the fort was used as a royal residence for the Durrani Empire since 1747, when the Afghan king, Ahmad Shah Durrani, conquered Peshawar. The Marathas briefly occupied it after capturing Peshawar in 1758 but it was soon retaken by the Afghans. The Sikhs destroyed and reconstructed the fort after capturing Peshawar in March 1823. In 1849, the British East India Company reconstructed the fort's outer walls.

The fort now serves as headquarters for Pakistan's Frontier Corps.

Etymology
The word Bālā Hissār is from Dari Persian, meaning "elevated or high fort." According to historian Hussain Khan, this name was given by the Afghan Emperor Timur Shah Durrani.

In 1834, the Sikhs named the fort as Samīr Gaṛh or Sameer Garh. Samīr was another name for Mount Kailash, a high peak in Tibet considered sacred in Hinduism, Buddhism, and Sikhism; Gaṛh means "fortress" in Hindustani. However, this name did not become popular and was soon replaced again by "Bala Hissar".

During the times of the Mughal Empire and Sur Empire, it was known as "Bagram Fort" after Bagram, another name for Peshawar.

Design 
The fort stands on a high mound in the northwestern corner of Peshawar City. Not long ago, the fort used to be conspicuously away from the old city of Peshawar, but now the construction of new buildings has covered space between the old city and the fort. However, the fort's position on a high mound gives a commanding and panoramic view of Peshawar and the entire Peshawar valley.

History 
According to historian Ahmad Hasan Dani, a Chinese Buddhist monk and traveller Xuanzang, when visiting Peshawar in 630 AD, found a "royal residence" and called it with Chinese word Kung Shing, which is used for its significance and is explained as fortified or walled portion of the town in which the royal palace stood. Hiuen Tsang then makes a separate mention of the city, which was not fortified. This shows that the royal residence formed the nucleus of a Citadel, which must have been further protected by a moat. Dani further says that a channel of old Bara River surrounded by a high spot, which includes the Bala Hissar and Inder Shahr. The higher area could have been the citadel, which is the present Bala Hissar. The fort still existed during the time of the Mughal Emperor Babur, who referred to it as Bagram Fort.

The fort was used as a royal residence for the Durrani Empire since December 1747, when Ahmad Shah Durrani conquered Peshawar. The Afghan King Timur Shah Durrani (1773–1793) used the fort as the winter capital of his empire. Up to the early 19th century, Peshawar was the winter capital of the Afghan Empire and the Bala Hissar was the royal residence of Afghan kings.

The Battle of Peshawar took place on 8 May 1758 between the Hindu Maratha Empire and the Durrani Empire. The Marathas were victorious in the battle and Peshawar was captured. The battle was seen as a huge success for the Marathas who hoisted the Bhagwa Jhanda (Saffron flag) on top of the Peshawar fort, their rule had now stretched from Pune to Delhi and now to the border of the Durrani Empire in Peshawar. Before that, the fort of Peshawar was being guarded by Durrani troops under Timur Shah Durrani and Jahan Khan. After being defeated by the army of Marathas, Durranis with Jahan Khan and Timur Shah Durrani left the fort meanwhile Marathas captured and took control of the fort. The victory in this battle is considered a great success for Marathas as now their rule had extended to the border of Afghanistan, located 2000 km far from their capital Pune.

The Sikhs fought and defeated the Afghans at the Battle of Nowshera near Peshawar in March 1823. The Sikhs followed this by the destruction of the Afghan royal court and the fort of Bala Hissar in Peshawar. Soon after, the Sikh commander-in-chief Hari Singh Nalwa commenced the reconstruction of the fort.

After the First Anglo-Sikh War in 1845-46, the British East India Company reconstructed the outer walls of Bala Hissar in 1849.

The fort is now used by the Frontier Corps, a paramilitary unit of the Pakistan Army.

As a Tourism Point 
The provincial government has expressed desire the control of the fort from the Frontier Corps in order to open it to tourists. The fort has been opened for tourists (Saturday for families only and Sundays will be opened for everyone, with or without family) without any cost, but tourists are requested to bring their CNIC along with them, while international tourists are requested to bring their passports. There is also a museum of the Frontier Corps in the fort showcasing the different uniforms of Frontier Corps throughout time since the start of Frontier Corps and weaponry used by different local units of Frontier Corps KP including but due to prevailing situation of COVID-19 Fort is currently closed for all types of visits.

Sepae also
List of UNESCO World Heritage Sites in Pakistan
List of forts in Pakistan
List of museums in Pakistan

References

External links

Frontier Corp
 

Archaeological sites in Khyber Pakhtunkhwa
Forts in Khyber Pakhtunkhwa
Tourist attractions in Peshawar
Sikh places